Karşıyaka BESEM Spor, short for Karşıyaka Beden Eğitimi ve Spor Eğitim Merkezi Spor Kulübü, is a women's football club based in Karşıyaka district of İzmir, Turkey.

The club was founded by Feriha Paylar, who serves also as the team coach, and her husband Erbil Paylar in 2007.

After finishing the Division 4 of the Women's Second League in the 2013–14 season as the runners-up, and winning the second leg play-off match against Amasya Eğitim Spor, the team was promoted to play for the 2014–15 season in the Women's First League.

Colors
The colors of Karşıyaka BESEM Spor are red, green and black.

Stadium
Karşıyaka BESEM Spor play their home matches at Hasan Türker Stadium in Atakent neighborhood of Karşıyaka district in Izmir.

Statistics
.

Current squad

Head coach:  Feriha Paylar

References

External links

Women's football clubs in Turkey
Sports teams in İzmir
2007 establishments in Turkey
Association football clubs established in 2007
Karşıyaka District